USS Lake Erie (CG-70) is a  guided missile cruiser of the United States Navy, commissioned in 1993. She was named after the U.S. Navy's decisive victory in the Battle of Lake Erie during the War of 1812. The cruiser was the first U.S. Navy ship to be commissioned in Hawaii.

History 
Lake Erie was built by Bath Iron Works in Bath, Maine. Her keel was laid on 6 March 1990 and she was launched on 13 July 1991. Upon completion of her sea-trials after construction, Lake Erie transferred to the Pacific Fleet and was commissioned on 24 July 1993 as the twenty-fourth Ticonderoga-class guided missile cruiser in her homeport of Pearl Harbor, Hawaii. Lake Erie is a baseline 4 Ticonderoga-class ship, with integrated AN/UYK-43/44 computers (in place of UYK-7 and UYK-20) and superset computer programs originally developed for the  guided missile destroyers. Lake Erie also has an improved UYS-20 data display system and various decision aids, as well as the SQS-53C sonar and the SQR-19 sonar data processor.

Service with the Constellation battle group 
As part of a seven ship battle group, led by the aircraft carrier , Lake Erie entered the Persian Gulf 11 January 1995. Along with the Constellation battle group, Lake Erie deployed 10 November 1994 and spent most of December in the western Pacific. The arrival of Constellation and her escorts strengthened the U.S. presence in the Persian Gulf and supported U.N. initiatives in the region, including Operation Southern Watch. In March Lake Erie took part in a two-week, anti-submarine warfare (ASW) exercise in the Persian Gulf and Gulf of Oman 5 to 19 February to gather data and evaluate tactics to counter the growing threat of third-world diesel submarines. For purposes of the exercise the US submarine  simulated a diesel submarine, while Lake Erie and  rounded out the surface forces. The first week of the exercise took place in the southern Persian Gulf, while the second week was held outside the Strait of Hormuz in the Gulf of Oman. Lake Erie and the other ships of the Constellation battle group returned home in May.

During a deployment with the Constellation battle group in July 1997,  turned over the duties of being regional Air Defense Commander to Lake Erie. In early August 1997 Lake Erie was involved in two major Theater Ballistic Missile Defense (TBMD) exercises in the Persian Gulf named Arabian Skies. During the exercises Constellations battle group demonstrated a viable TBMD capability using the existing command and control architecture. Lake Erie then departed 5th Fleet's Area of Responsibility (AOR) 17 August 1997 on schedule to continue her routine six-month deployment in the waters of the Indian Ocean and Pacific Ocean. On 16 May 1998 Lake Erie returned to the Persian Gulf with elements of the Constellation battle group before she concluded her tour in the 5th Fleet with a joint-combined exercise with military forces from Pakistan. Dubbed "Inspired Siren 97-2" and "Inspired Alert 97-2," the exercises incorporated both surface combatants and air components, respectively. The purpose of this four-day training mission was to exercise the joint-combined naval and air capabilities of both countries, improve their respective levels of readiness and interoperability, and enhance military relations between the two nations.

Aegis Ballistic Missile Defense System testbed 
Ballistic missile testing afforded Port Royal and other participants an opportunity to flex the capabilities of the current Aegis weapon system against a live ballistic missile target and gave a representation of how the modified system tracks and destroys TBMs.

Lake Erie and Port Royal were then to conduct at sea testing, develop core doctrine and tactics, and serve as focal points for putting the TBMD technology in the hands of the warfighters in the rest of the fleet. Sailors on board both ships were also to provide early feedback to the technical community and influence the final design of the TBMD system. Successful Linebacker sea trials at the Pacific Missile Range, Kauai, Hawaii took place in the fall of 1998.

On 17 December 1999, Lake Erie returned to her homeport at Naval Station Pearl Harbor after completing a six-month deployment to the western Pacific and Persian Gulf. The guided missile cruiser had once more deployed with the Constellation battle group.

In March 2000, the US Navy began ALI live fire tests and had successfully conducted the first Controlled Test Vehicle.  had conducted the first ALI live firing test in September 1999 and had successfully demonstrated the launch and flight sequence through third stage separation as well as verified flight stability at extreme altitude. Though the original plan had been to conduct all Flight Test Round shots from Shiloh, the need for further testing conflicted with her operational schedule. Therefore, it was decided by the Chief of Naval Operations to shift to Lake Erie to conduct the next firings in the ALI testing program. Lake Erie, already equipped with Area Linebacker modifications, was, as of 2 March 2000, receiving ALI equipment modifications in Pearl Harbor and was to conduct system checks and training to support the planned test firings.

In early July 2000, the US Navy announced that Lake Erie had been designated the Navy's theater-wide test ship for the AEGIS Lightweight Exoatmospheric Projectile intercept flight-test series. For the next two years, Lake Erie would be dedicated to conducting these critical tests. Lake Erie'''s home port in Pearl Harbor, Hawaii, made the ship's participation in tests at the Pacific Missile Range Facility off Kauai cost-effective with the Navy anticipating that the ship would not deploy operationally again for about two years.

In January 2001, Lake Erie conducted the Aegis Light Exo-Atmospheric Projectile (LEAP) Intercept Flight Test Round (FTR-1A) mission in the mid-Pacific using the Pacific Missile Range Facility, Kauai, Hawaii. Equipped with Aegis LEAP Intercept (ALI) computer programs and hardware, Lake Erie launched an SM-3 missile demonstrating third stage airframe stability and control through nominal kinetic warhead fourth stage separation. The SM-3 is the Navy's new exo-atmospheric missile developed to counter theater ballistic missile (TBM) threats outside the atmosphere.

On 9 February 2001 Lake Erie sortied from Pearl Harbor to assist along with Coast Guard boats and cutters with rescue efforts after the attack submarine  struck a Japanese fishing vessel while surfacing at approximately 1:45 pm (HST) about nine miles south of the Diamond Head crater off Honolulu, Hawaii. Twenty-six of 35 aboard were rescued. Ehime Maru had been on a fishing and research mission when Greeneville rapidly surfaced and collided with her stern. In this case it was used for training, on a one-day cruise with 16 military and civilian guests.

On 25 January 2002 the Missile Defense Agency and the Navy conducted a successful flight test in the continuing development of a Sea-Based Midcourse (SMD) Ballistic Missile Defense System (BMDS). Flight Mission-2 (FM-2) involved the launch of a developmental Standard Missile 3 (SM-3) and kinetic warhead (KW) interceptor from Lake Erie and an Aries target missile launched from the Pacific Missile Range Facility (PMRF) on the island of Kauai, Hawaii. The target was launched at 18:00 (EST) 26 January. About eight minutes later, Lake Erie, equipped with Aegis Lightweight Exo-atmospheric Projectile (LEAP) computer programs and equipment, and having tracked the target with the Aegis SPY-1 radar and developed a fire-control solution, launched the newly developed SM-3. The SM-3 acquired, tracked and diverted toward the target, demonstrating SM-3 fourth-stage Kinetic Warhead (KW) guidance, navigation and control. Although not a primary objective, during this early developmental test, the KW was aimed at the target, resulting in a hit-to-kill intercept at approximately 18:18 (EST).

The primary objective of this test was to evaluate SM-3 fourth-stage Kinetic Warhead guidance, navigation and control, with extensive engineering evaluation data collected for analyses in preparation for future flight tests. It was the fourth in a planned series of nine developmental test flights for the SMD program. The mission also included the first fully operational SM-3 with a live Solid Divert and Attitude Control System to steer the KW into the target.

In March 2003 she was assigned to Cruiser-Destroyer Group One.

USS Lake Erie was featured in the 2011 naval thriller, Thunder in the Morning Calm, by Don Brown.

On 14 February 2008 the U.S. Department of Defense announced that as part of Operation Burnt Frost Lake Erie and two other ships would attempt to hit the failed satellite USA-193 in the north Pacific just prior to burn up during a period after 20 February using a modified SM-3 missile. On 21 February 2008, at approximately 3:30 UTC, the missile was fired and later confirmed to have struck the satellite. The military intended that the kinetic energy of the missile would rupture the hydrazine fuel tank allowing the toxic fuel to be consumed during re-entry.

In August 2014, Lake Erie went to San Diego for an extended maintenance period. Lake Erie'' was expected to replace  as a rotational Ballistic Missile Defense (BMD) deployer after the maintenance period.

On 30 November 2017, Lake Erie arrived in Pearl Harbor following a seven-month deployment to the Indo-Asia-Pacific region and the Persian Gulf.

References

External links 

 
 
 
 

 

Ticonderoga-class cruisers
Ships built in Bath, Maine
1991 ships
Cruisers of the United States